"Unfinished" is a song by Mandisa, released as the lead single from her fifth studio album, Out of the Dark on March 10, 2017.

Composition
"Unfinished" is originally in the key of A major, with a tempo of 93 beats per minute. Written in common time, Mandisa's vocal range spans from A3 to E5 during the song.

Commercial performance
On March 25, 2017, Unfinished entered the Billboard Hot Christian Songs chart at 34. The following week, it leaped to number 13 after a digital sales boost. After the release of her fifth studio album, Out of the Dark, the song entered the Top 10 for the first time at number 8, its peak. The song has spent 26 weeks on the Hot Christian Songs chart.

Music video
A lyric video for the single "Unfinished" was released on March 17, 2017.

Accolades

Charts

Weekly charts

Year-end charts

References 

2017 singles
2017 songs
Mandisa songs
Sparrow Records singles
Songs written by Ben Glover